"Default" is the debut single by English supergroup Atoms for Peace. It was released as a download on 10 September 2012 and on 12" vinyl on 4 December 2012. This was the first non-remixed track released by the band and featured on their debut album, Amok.

History
While scheduled for release on 10 September 2012, "Default" was made available for sale on iTunes on 6 September. At this point, Thom Yorke announced on the Radiohead website details of the song's release. On 26 September, details of the vinyl release were announced, stating that the track "What the Eyeballs Did" would serve as the single's B-side.

Track listing

References

External links

Official website

2012 songs
2012 debut singles
Songs written by Thom Yorke
Songs written by Flea (musician)
Song recordings produced by Nigel Godrich
Atoms for Peace (band) songs